This is a list of the National Register of Historic Places entries in New Rochelle, New York.  See also National Register of Historic Places listings in Westchester County, New York for all others in the county.

This is intended to be a complete list of properties and districts listed on the National Register of Historic Places in New Rochelle, New York.  The locations of National Register properties and districts (at least for all showing latitude and longitude coordinates below) may be seen in a Google map by clicking on "Map of all coordinates".



Current listings

|}

See also

National Register of Historic Places listings in New York
National Register of Historic Places listings in southern Westchester County, New York
New Rochelle Historic Sites

References

.
.
New Rochelle
New Rochelle
New Rochelle, New York